Rhythmic Gymnastics individual all-around competition at the 2009 Mediterranean Games was held in Pescara, Italy.

Competition schedule

Competitions followed this timetable:

Medal winners

Women's

Medal table

Results

References

 Final Results

Rhythmic Gymnastics,2009
Mediterranean Games,2009
Sports at the 2009 Mediterranean Games
2009 in gymnastics
International gymnastics competitions hosted by Italy